Haven Lake is a lake in the Unorganized Part of Kenora District in Northwestern Ontario, Canada. It is in the Hudson Bay drainage basin, and is within Woodland Caribou Provincial Park.

The primary inflow, arriving at the south from an unnamed lake, and outflow, leaving at the northwest and leading towards Rostoul Lake, is Haven Creek, which flows via the Rostoul River, the Gammon River, the Bloodvein River, Lake Winnipeg, and the Nelson River to Hudson Bay.

See also
List of lakes in Ontario

References

Lakes of Kenora District